SS John Sergeant was a Liberty ship built in the United States during World War II. She was named after John Sergeant, an American politician who represented Pennsylvania in the United States House of Representatives. He was the National Republican Party's vice presidential nominee in the 1832 presidential election, serving on a ticket with Senator Henry Clay.

Construction
John Sergeant was laid down on 6 July 1942, under a Maritime Commission (MARCOM) contract, MCE hull 63, by the Bethlehem-Fairfield Shipyard, Baltimore, Maryland; and was launched on 21 August 1942.

History
She was allocated to Marine Transport Lines, Inc., on 5 September 1942.

On 23 July 1948, she was laid up in the National Defense Reserve Fleet, Mobile, Alabama. On 7 October 1949, she was laid up in the National Defense Reserve Fleet, Beaumont, Texas. On 18 July 1952, she was laid up in the National Defense Reserve Fleet, Wilmington, North Carolina. On 14 September 1955, she was withdrawn from the fleet for test conversion to rotary compression pump fed open cycle gas turbine power. The Newport News Shipbuilding and Drydock Company, Newport News, Virginia, performed the conversion and she was reclassified EC2-G-8f.

After conversion she was transferred to the Military Sea Transportation Service. She was operated by United States Lines Co. under a bareboat charter.

On 11 September 1959, she was laid up in the James River Reserve Fleet, Lee Hall, Virginia. She was sold for scrapping on 28 March 1972, to Peck Iron & Metal Co., Inc., for $38,208. She was removed from the fleet, 20 April 1972.

References

Bibliography

 
 
 
 
 

 

Liberty ships
1942 ships
Ships built in Baltimore
Mobile Reserve Fleet
Beaumont Reserve Fleet
Wilmington Reserve Fleet
James River Reserve Fleet